A list of American films released in 1904.

See also
 1904 in the United States

External links

1904 films at the Internet Movie Database

1904
Films
American
1900s in American cinema